Burkard Wilhelm Leist (12 July 1819 in Westen – 31 December 1906 in Jena) was a German jurist.

Biography
He studied at Göttingen, Heidelberg and Berlin. He was appointed professor of civil law at Basel in 1846, at Rostock in 1847, and from 1853 he filled that chair at the University of Jena. He was a pupil of Savigny. He combined the historical method with analysis. After studies on the fundamental material of law, especially Roman law, he did valuable research in the hypothetical field of Indo-Germanic law.

Works
Among his works were:
 Die Bonorum Possessio, ihre geschichtliche Entwickelung und heutige Geltung (1844–48)
 Versuche einer Geschichte der römischen Rechtssysteme (1850)
 Civilistische Studien auf dem Gebiet dogmatischer Analyse (1854–77)
 Mancipation und Eigentumstradition (1865)
 Der römische Erbrechtsbesitz (1871)
 Altarisches Jus Gentium (1889)
 Altarisches Jus Civile (1892–96)

Notes

References
 
 

1819 births
1906 deaths
Jurists from Lower Saxony
University of Göttingen alumni
Heidelberg University alumni
Humboldt University of Berlin alumni
Academic staff of the University of Basel
Academic staff of the University of Rostock
Academic staff of the University of Jena
People from Verden (district)